Pawsonaster is a monotypic genus of echinoderms belonging to the family Goniasteridae. The only species is Pawsonaster parvus.

The species is found in America.

References

Goniasteridae
Asteroidea genera
Monotypic echinoderm genera